Fraser Brown may refer to:

Fraser Brown (Australian footballer) (born 1970), Australian rules footballer
Fraser Brown (rugby union) (born 1989), Scottish rugby union player
Fraser Brown (sailor) (born 1970), Irish sailor